The articular processes or zygapophyses (Greek ζυγον = "yoke" (because it links two vertebrae) + απο = "away" + φυσις = "process") of a vertebra are projections of the vertebra that serve the purpose of fitting with an adjacent vertebra. The actual region of contact is called the articular facet.

Articular processes spring from the junctions of the pedicles and laminæ, and there are two right and left, and two superior and inferior. These stick out of an end of a vertebra to lock with a zygapophysis on the next vertebra, to make the backbone more stable.

 The superior processes or prezygapophysis project upward from a lower vertebra, and their articular surfaces are directed more or less backward (oblique coronal plane). 
 The inferior processes or postzygapophysis project downward from a higher vertebra, and their articular surfaces are directed more or less forward and outward.

The articular surfaces are coated with hyaline cartilage.

In the cervical vertebral column, the articular processes collectively form the articular pillars. These are the bony surfaces palpated just lateral to the spinous processes.

Additional images

See also
 Pars interarticularis
 Zygapophyseal joint

References

External links
 
Articular processes - BlueLink Anatomy - University of Michigan Medical School
  - "Lumbar Vertebral Column, Posterolateral View"
  - "Superior and lateral views of typical vertebrae."
 Photo of model at Waynesburg College skeleton2/inferiorarticularprocess
 Photo of model at Waynesburg College skeleton2/superiorarticularprocess

Bones of the thorax